Rob Rogers may refer to:
 Rob Rogers (referee)
 Rob Rogers (cartoonist)